Syzygium perakense is a species of plant in the family Myrtaceae. It is a tree native to Peninsular Malaysia.

References

perakense
Trees of Peninsular Malaysia
Taxonomy articles created by Polbot
Taxobox binomials not recognized by IUCN